Dmitri Leonidovich Radchenko (born 2 December 1970) is a Russian football coach and former player who played as a striker.

During his professional career he played in four countries, including in La Liga.

Career
Born in Leningrad, Soviet Union, Radchenko started his professional career in his hometown, moving in 1991 to FC Spartak Moscow and helping the capital side to the first two editions of the Russian Premier League. In the 1990–91 edition of the European Cup he was essential in the quarter-final ousting of Real Madrid, notably scoring twice in the 3–1 away win.

For 1993–94, Radchenko signed with Racing Santander in Spain alongside teammate Dmitri Popov, and experienced arguably the best years in his career, notably scoring in a 5–0 home routing of FC Barcelona in his second season. A move to rising Deportivo de La Coruña followed, but he failed to establish in the starting XI, although heavily featured; the next three campaigns combined, he only netted once, with Rayo Vallecano, CP Mérida (both relegated from La Liga) and SD Compostela (Segunda División – where he shared teams again with Popov).

After relative success with Júbilo Iwata and HNK Hajduk Split, Radchenko finished his career in 2008 in the lower leagues of Spain (with some periods of inactivity in between). He played for Russia at the 1994 FIFA World Cup, where he scored a goal against Cameroon (6–1, with the remaining five courtesy of Oleg Salenko).

Career statistics

Club

International

Scores and results list Russia's goal tally first, score column indicates score after each Radchenko goal.

Honours
Russian Premier League: 1992, 1993
USSR/CIS Cup: 1992
Russian Cup: 1994
Supercopa de España: 1995

References

External links

RussiaTeam biography and profile 

1970 births
Living people
Footballers from Saint Petersburg
Soviet footballers
Russian footballers
Russian football managers
Association football forwards
Soviet Top League players
Soviet First League players
Russian Premier League players
FC Dynamo Saint Petersburg players
FC Zenit Saint Petersburg players
FC Spartak Moscow players
La Liga players
Segunda División players
Tercera División players
Racing de Santander players
Deportivo de La Coruña players
Rayo Vallecano players
CP Mérida footballers
Bergantiños FC players
SD Compostela footballers
J1 League players
Júbilo Iwata players
Croatian Football League players
HNK Hajduk Split players
Soviet Union international footballers
Russia international footballers
Dual internationalists (football)
1994 FIFA World Cup players
Russian expatriate footballers
Expatriate footballers in Spain
Expatriate footballers in Croatia
Expatriate footballers in Japan
Russian expatriate sportspeople in Spain
Russian expatriate sportspeople in Japan
Russian people of Ukrainian descent
Russian expatriate football managers